The Four Garrisons of Anxi were Chinese military garrisons installed by the Tang dynasty between 648 and 658. They were stationed at the Indo-European city-states of Qiuci (Kucha), Yutian (Hotan), Shule (Kashgar) and Yanqi (Karashahr). The Protectorate General to Pacify the West was headquartered in Qiuci.

History
The Anxi Protectorate was created in Xi Prefecture (Gaochang) after the Tang dynasty successfully annexed the oasis kingdom in 640. The protectorate was moved to Qiuci in 648 after the Tang dynasty defeated Kucha. However, due to local unrest with support from the Western Turkic Khaganate the Tang protector general was assassinated and the protectorate was moved back to Xi Prefecture in 651. When the Tang dynasty defeated the Western Turkic Khaganate in 658, the protectorate headquarter was moved back to Qiuci. The full establishment of the Four Garrisons, and with them a formal Tang military protectorate over the Tarim Basin, is therefore dated to 658 after Ashina Helu's defeat.

Following the decline of Turkic hegemony over the region, the Tibetan Empire became the primary contender for power with the Tang dynasty. The Tibetan Empire repeatedly invaded the Tarim Basin and neighboring kingdoms. The Western Regions were highly contested and ownership of areas switched repeatedly between Tibetan Empire and the Tang dynasty. During this period the protectorate headquarter was moved to Suiye, also known as Suyab, The Tang achieved relative stability after 692 and moved the protectorate back to Qiuci where it remained until the protectorate's demise in the 790s.

In 702 Wu Zetian created the Beiting Protectorate and granted it control of Ting Prefecture (Jimsar County), Yi Prefecture (Hami) and Xi Prefecture.

The Tibetan Empire continued to attack the Anxi Protectorate but were unable to gain a foothold until the An Lushan Rebellion occurred in 755. The Tang dynasty recalled the majority of their garrison troops from the frontier to deal with the rebellion and thus allowed the Tibetans an opportunity to invade the Tang borderlands with impunity. In 763 a large Tibetan army managed to occupy the Tang capital of Chang'an for a brief period of time before they were forced to retreat. In the same year the Tibetan Empire occupied Yanqi.

The neighboring Hexi Corridor and Beiting Protectorate were also invaded. Under the Hexi Jiedushi, the Tang lost Liang Prefecture in 764, Gan and Su prefectures in 766, Gua Prefecture in 776, and Sha Prefecture in 787. The Beiting Protectorate lost Yi Prefecture in 781, Ting Prefecture in 790, and Xi Prefecture in 792.

The Anxi Protectorate lost its seat in Qiuci in 787 and Yutian in 792. It's unclear what happened to Shule.

Cities

Kucha

The Buddhist monk Xuanzang visited Kucha in the 630s and described it in the following manner:

Karasahr

According to the Book of Zhou, compiled around 636, Karasahr was a small and poor country composed of several walled towns:

Kashgar

Xuanzang visited Kashgar around 644.

Khotan
Xuanzang visited Khotan in 644 and stayed there for eight months.

See also
Chinese military history
Administrative divisions of the Tang dynasty

References

Citations

Sources 

 

 (alk. paper)

 Chen, Guocan. "Anxi Sizhen" ("Four Garrisons of Anxi"). Encyclopedia of China (Chinese History Edition), 1st ed. 

  (paperback).
 

 
 .
 

 

 

 
 
 
 
 

 
 
  
 
 
  
 
 

648 establishments
791 disestablishments
History of Xinjiang
Chinese Central Asia
Military history of the Tang dynasty